Annah Mac is a New Zealand singer-songwriter, producer and musician. Her debut album, Little Stranger was released on the 5 September 2011, it was listed for seven weeks on the New Zealand Albums Top 40 Chart. The most successful single off the album was "Girl in Stilettos". The single was certified double platinum in New Zealand and was listed for 23 weeks on the New Zealand Top 40.

Musical career
Mac moved to Auckland at the age of 17 and signed a deal with Sony Music New Zealand in November 2009.

In November 2011, Mac's single "Girl In Stilettos" was released and certified double platinum. The music video was funded by NZ On Air. In March 2012, Mac opened for One Direction on the NZ Leg of their world tour. In April 2012, Mac won an International Songwriting Award for original "Celia". She was nominated for a New Zealand Silver Scroll Award for "Girl In Stilettos" and also for two categories in the Vodafone New Zealand Music Awards, Breakthrough Artist and Best Single for "Girl In Stilettos". Mac performed at the awards ceremony. In September 2012, Mac performed the national anthem for the All Blacks at the All Blacks vs Springbox game in Dunedin. Towards the end of 2012, Mac released the final single from the album titled "Bucket". The single was to feature as part of a Deluxe Album release in early 2013 from Sony Music, but the edition was pulled.

In 2016 Mac began a collaboration with the Otago Corrections Facility, teaching prisoners in the Milton facility to play the ukulele and write songs. The collaboration led to Mac's production company Big House Records releasing a CD of 37 original songs, “The Kowhai Project”, in March 2021. Proceeds of the sale of the CD are donated to the Dunedin Night Shelter.

Discography

Studio albums

Singles

References

Living people
New Zealand rock musicians
1991 births
21st-century New Zealand women singers
Sony Music New Zealand artists